Agh Ziarat (also Romanized as Āgh Zīārat; also known as Āq Zīārat) is a village in Quri Chay-ye Sharqi Rural District of the Central District of Charuymaq County, East Azerbaijan province, Iran. At the 2006 National Census, its population was 383 in 75 households. The following census in 2011 counted 373 people in 103 households. The latest census in 2016 showed a population of 317 people in 101 households; it was the largest village in its rural district.

References 

Charuymaq County

Populated places in East Azerbaijan Province

Populated places in Charuymaq County